The Swingin's Mutual! is an album by the George Shearing quintet, accompanied on the original 1961 release on six songs by the vocalist Nancy Wilson.

Reception
The initial Billboard review from March 13, 1961 commented of Wilson's singing that "These are standout renditions by the youthful thrush, in which she offers fanciful, stylised and sometimes moody interpretations as "Born to Be Blue", "The Things We Did Last Summer", "Let's Live Again" and "On Green Dolphin Street". The contemporaneous DownBeat reviewer concluded: "This is a pleasant, at times, even enjoyable album. The biggest flaw is its superficiality and lack of real effort on the parts of two fine artists [Shearing and Wilson]".

Track listing (1997 Jazz Heritage CD reissue)
 "The Things We Did Last Summer" (Sammy Cahn, Jule Styne) – 2:41
 "All Night Long" (Curtis Reginald Lewis) – 3:06
 "Gentleman Friend" (Arnold B. Horwitt, Richard Lewine) – 2:03
 "Born to Be Blue" (Mel Tormé, Robert Wells) – 2:14
 "I Remember Clifford" (Benny Golson) – 2:35
 "On Green Dolphin Street" (Bronisław Kaper, Ned Washington) – 2:22
 "Let's Live Again" (Milt Raskin, George Shearing) – 2:21
 "Whisper Not" (Golson) – 2:50
 "The Nearness of You" (Hoagy Carmichael, Washington) – 2:58
 "Evansville" (Marjorie Ericsson) – 2:03
 "Don't Call Me" (Ericsson) – 2:46
 "Inspiration" (George Shearing) – 2:14
 "You Are There" Cy Walter, Chilton Ryan) – 2:08
 "Wait till You See Her" (Lorenz Hart, Richard Rodgers) – 2:49
 "Blue Lou" (Irving Mills, Edgar Sampson) – 2:16
 "Oh! Look at Me Now" (Joe Bushkin, John DeVries) – 2:11
 "Lullaby of Birdland" (Shearing, George David Weiss) – 2:22

Personnel

Performance
Nancy Wilson – vocals (tracks 1-4, 6, 7 & 9)
The George Shearing Quintet:
George Shearing – piano
Dick Garcia – guitar
Warren Chiasson or Eddie Costa – vibraphone
Raplh Peña or George Duvivier – double bass
Armando Peraza – percussion
Vernel Fournier or Walter Bolden – drums

Production
Michael Cuscuna – producer
Pete Welding – producer, liner notes

Recorded in Los Angeles, May 1964.

References

1961 albums
George Shearing albums
Nancy Wilson (jazz singer) albums
Capitol Records albums
Collaborative albums
Albums recorded at Capitol Studios